Man Kunto Maula is a Manqabat Qawwali song composed by Amir Khusro in the praise of Ali ibn Abi Talib. This song is based on a hadith, i.e. a saying of the Islamic prophet Muhammad:

Whoever accepts me as a Maula(Love), Ali is his Maula(Love) too

Man Kunto Maula
shaah-e-mardaaN
sher-e-yazdaaN
quvvat-e-parvardigaar
laa fatah illaa Ali
laa saif illaa zulfiqaar

King of the brave,
lion of God,
[and] strength of God.
There is no victory Except (Without) A

Ali [and]
there is no sword like Zulfiqaar*.

* Zulfiqaar was the sword of Ali Pereanted By Allah In Jung Ul Uhud when He Was Saving Prophet Mohammed From Enimies Of Allah and Prophet Including Abu Sufiyan, Abu Jehel, Khalid Bin Waleed(all To fasther and Son), And Many Others, After Jung Al Uhud they All Converted To Islam.

Ali imaam-e-manasto manam Ghulaam-e-Ali
hazaar jaan-e-giraamii fidaa-e-naam-e-Ali

Ali is my master, I am the slave of Ali
thousands of lives can be sacrificed for the sacredness of name of Ali.

man kunto maulaa
fa haaza Aliun maulaa

To whom I am the master
Ali is the master.

Note: A famous tradition (hadith) of Prophet Muhammad. Ali was his cousin and son-in-law.

daaraa dil daaraa dil daar-e-daanii
tum tum taa naa naa naanaa, naanaa naanaa re
yaalaalii yaalaalii yaalaa, yaalaa yaalaa

Dar – Bheetar, Aandar (inside)
Dara – Andar Aa (get in or come inside)
Dartan – Tanke Aandar (inside the body)
Tanandara – Tanke Aandar Aa (Come inside the body)
Tom – Main Tum Hun (I am you)
Nadirdani – Tu Sabse Adhik Janata Hai (You know more than anyone else)
Tandardani – Tanke Aandarka Jannewala (One who knows what is inside the body)

Tanan Dar Aa - Enter my body.
O Dani - He knows
Tu Dani - You know.
Na Dir Dani - You are the Complete Wisdom.
Tom - I am yours, I belong to you.
Yala - Ya Allah
Yali - Ya Ali.

Ali shaah-e-mardaaN imaamun kabiiraa
ke baad az nabii shud bashirun naziiraa

Ali is the king of the brave and the great leader
because after the Prophet, there is Ali.

References

Qawwali songs
Indian songs